Antoni Andrzej Łyko (27 May 1907 – 3 June 1941) was a Polish footballer (striker) and a member of the Poland national football team for the 1938 FIFA World Cup. However, he did not actually travel to Strasbourg for the tournament. His club at that time was Wisła Kraków. He was capped twice for Poland, with both games against Latvia.  Implicated in support of the Polish Armed Resistance, Lyko was arrested by the Gestapo on the streets of Krakow during German occupation in World War II, and taken to Auschwitz concentration camp, where he was shot in June 1941.

References

Sources 
 Andrzej Gowarzewski : "Fuji Football Encyclopedia. History of the Polish National Team (1)White and Red " ;GiA Katowice 1991 

1907 births
1941 deaths
Polish footballers
Wisła Kraków players
1938 FIFA World Cup players
Poland international footballers
Polish civilians killed in World War II
Polish people who died in Auschwitz concentration camp
Footballers from Kraków
Polish Austro-Hungarians
People from the Kingdom of Galicia and Lodomeria
Association football forwards
Polish people executed in Nazi concentration camps
People executed by Nazi Germany by firing squad